Sherard Parker (born 10 March 1980) is a Canadian actor. He has appeared on the Australian Television series MDA (2005) and in The Recruit (2003).

Career
Parker's first appeared in Roger Donaldson's CIA thriller The Recruit (2003) starring Al Pacino, playing a CIA agent and recently in Il Futuro (2013), with Rutger Hauer and notably in the British independent film He Who Dares (2014) playing an SAS captain. His theatre credits include an adaptation of Louise M. Alcott's Little Women, where he played the role of German professor Bhaer at the Singapore Repertory Theatre.

Filmography
 Island (short) (2004)
 MDA (TV series) (2005)
 The Good Samaritan (short) (2005)
 The Chase (short) (2006)
 THE CHASE (short) (2012)

External links

Sherard Parker Celebrities on weblo.com
Royal Shakespeare Company  at srt.com.sg
Angry Film Festival at angryproductions.com

Living people
1978 births
Canadian male television actors